Krupniki  is a village in the administrative district of Gmina Choroszcz, within Białystok County, Podlaskie Voivodeship, in north-eastern Poland.

The village is considered part of Metropolitan Białystok in order to help economically develop the region.

References

Krupniki